The following is a complete list of New Mexico State Aggies football seasons. The Aggies currently compete as an independent and have an overall record of 440–664–30 in 128 seasons. They have appeared in 4 bowl games with a record of 3–0–1.

Seasons

Notes

References:

References

New Mexico State Aggies

New Mexico State Aggies football seasons